No Matter What is a 2020 South Korean television series starring Na Hye-mi, Choi Woong, Jung Min-ah and Kim Jung-heon. The series, directed by Sung Joon-hae and written by High Phoenix, revolves around an extended family and a flower shop filled with beautiful flowers 365 days in a year.

The daily drama premiered on KBS1 on October 12, 2020 and aired every weekday at 20:30 (KST), till March 26, 2021. 
The 94th episode, aired on February 18, 2021 logged an audience rating of 22.5% nationwide: the highest rating recorded by the series during its run.

Synopsis
A family drama revolving around a flower shop filled with beautiful flowers 365 days in a year. It tells the story of children who experienced parental divorce and remarriage and grew up fighting in a world of prejudice, fiercely overcoming difficulties in work and love.

Cast
Cast and characters profile:

Main
 Na Hye-mi as Kim Bo-ra, 28 yo, a Weather caster of DBS Press Bureau, with a good face and heart. Won-tae and Hae-shim's eldest daughter.
 Choi Woong as Kang Dae-ro, a youth creator, who dreams and works and a passionate delivery man.
 Jung Min-ah as Shin Ah-ri, 28 yo, a broadcasting writer who has nothing scary in the world. With a brittle hair and gun-shining eyes. The second daughter of Junghan.
 Kim Jung-heon as Na Jun-su, 30 yo, a tough and competent start-up CEO. Representative of the 'Day Break' market.

Supporting
 Do Ji-won as Hae-sim, 52 yo, florist, president of 'Piera Florist', mother of Bo-ra
 Kim Yu-seok as Sin Joong-han, 54 yo a 'Plus Market' Sales Manager, attentive and prudent, deep and caring
 Jeong Han-yong as Maengsoo Lee, lived as a school teacher and then retired as a principal. Hae-shim's father.
 Moon Hee-kyung as Noh Geum-suk (54 yo), Jun-su's mother, Hae-shim's High School Alumni.
 Kim Seung-wook as Na Seung-jin (in 60s), Jun-su's father, CEO of 'I Production'.
 Jo Mi-ryung as Lee Ji-ran, (50 years old), Director of DBS broadcasting station.
 Taehwa Seo as Kim Won-tae (55 yo), Managing Director of 'Plus Market'.
 Lee Kan-hee as Jeong Nan-young (52 yo) Forge's mother. Ah-ri's birth mother.
 Kim Ha-yeon as Jeong byori (12 years old), Nan-young's daughter.
 Song Chan-ik as Park Ja-geun (27 years old/), Assistant director of 'Natural People Live'.
 Jang Sung-yoon as Lee Eun-bi, a Natural person lives', the youngest artist.
Others
 Park Chul-min as Han Eok-shim, (in 70s), Natural person.
 Kim Dong-hui as Secretary Kim (in 30s) Junsu's secretary.

Original soundtrack

Part 1

Part 2

Part 3

Part 4

Part 5

Part 6

Part 7

Part 8

Part 9

Part 10

Part 11

Part 12

Part 13

Part 14

Part 15

Part 16

Part 17

Part 18

Part 19

Part 20

Part 21

Part 22

Part 23

Part 24

Part 25

Part 26

Part 27

Part 28

Part 29

Part 30

Part 31

Part 32

Part 33

Part 34

Part 35

Part 36

Viewership 
Audience response
As per Nielsen Korea, the 101th episode logged a national average viewership of 22.4% with 3.6 million viewers watching the episode, thereby taking the series at 23rd place among 'Top 50 series per nationwide viewers in Korea'.

Awards and nominations

References

External links
  
 No Matter What at Daum 
 No Matter What at Naver 
 

Korean Broadcasting System television dramas
2020 South Korean television series debuts
Korean-language television shows
South Korean romantic comedy television series
2021 South Korean television series endings